The 1928 UCLA Bruins football team was an American football team that represented the University of California, Los Angeles (UCLA) during the 1928 college football season.  In their fourth year under head coach William H. Spaulding and their first as a member of the Pacific Coast Conference (PCC), the Bruins compiled a 4–4–1 record (0–4 conference), finished in ninth place in the PCC, and outscored their opponents by a combined total of 171 to 136.

Schedule

References

UCLA
UCLA Bruins football seasons
UCLA Bruins football